Sheykh Miri-ye Sadat (also Romanized as Sheykh Mīrī-ye Sādāt; also known as Shaikh Mīri and Sheykh Mīrī) is a village in Hemmatabad Rural District, in the Central District of Borujerd County, Lorestan Province, Iran. At the 2006 census, its population was 1,211, in 285 families.

References 

Towns and villages in Borujerd County